Salome (minor planet designation: 562 Salome) is a minor planet orbiting the Sun that was discovered by German astronomer Max Wolf on 3 April 1905 from Heidelberg. It is named after Salome, the daughter of Herodias who is referenced in the New Testament.

This is a member of the dynamic Eos family of asteroids that most likely formed as the result of a collisional breakup of a parent body.

References

External links 
 
 

000562
Discoveries by Max Wolf
Named minor planets
000562
19050403